von Allmen is a surname. Notable people with the surname include:

Beat von Allmen (born 1941), Swiss alpine skier
Peter von Allmen (born 1978), Swiss cross-country skier
Heinz von Allmen (1913–2003), Swiss alpine and cross-country skier